The Andaman worm snake (Gerrhopilus andamanensis) is a species of harmless blind snake in the family Gerrhopilidae. The species is endemic to the Andaman Islands. No subspecies are currently recognized.

Geographic range
It is found in the Andaman Islands in the Bay of Bengal. The type locality given is "Andaman Islands".

References

Further reading

Boulenger GA (1893). Catalogue of the Snakes in the British Museum (Natural History). Volume I., Containing the Families Typhlopidæ ... London: Trustees of the British Museum (Natural History). (Taylor and Francis, printers). xiii + 448 pp. + Plates I-XXVIII. (Typhlops andamanensis, p. 52).
Stoliczka F (1871). "Notes on some Indian and Burmese Ophidians". J. Asiatic Soc. Bengal, Calcutta 40: 421–445. (Typhlops andamanensis, new species, pp. 428–429 + Plate XXV, figures 9–12).
Vidal N, Marin J, Morini M, Donnellan S, Branch WR, Thomas R, Vences M, Wynn A, Cruaud C, Hedges SB (2010). "Blindsnake evolutionary tree reveals long history on Gondwana". Biology Letters 6: 558–561. (Gerrhopilus andamanensis, new combination).

Gerrhopilus
Reptiles of India
Endemic fauna of the Andaman Islands
Taxa named by Ferdinand Stoliczka
Reptiles described in 1871